The 1935–36 St. Francis Terriers men's basketball team represented St. Francis College during the 1935–36 NCAA men's basketball season. The team was coached by Rody Cooney, who was in his fourth year at the helm of the St. Francis Terriers. The team was a member of the Metropolitan New York Conference and played its home games at the Bulter Street Gymnasium in  their Cobble Hill, Brooklyn campus.

The 1935–36 team finished 15–8 overall and 4–6 in conference play. This was the Terriers first season in which they participated in a post-season tournament. The Terriers were invited to play in the District 1 tryouts at Madison Square Garden for the 1936 Summer Olympics. The Terriers were selected after LIU, NYU and Columbia declined to compete. In the Olympic tryouts the Terriers defeated Springfield College, the birthplace of Basketball, at Madison Square Garden and during the game set two Garden records. They shot 81.3% from the foul line, and 33.3% from the floor. NYU previously held the free-throw percent record and LIU the field-goal percent record, which was previously 16%.

Roster

   

  

  

     

source

Schedule and results

|-
!colspan=12 style="background:#0038A8; border: 2px solid #CE1126;;color:#FFFFFF;"| Regular Season

  

  
|-
!colspan=12 style="background:#0038A8; border: 2px solid #CE1126;;color:#FFFFFF;"| 1936 Olympics Tryouts

 
|-

References

St. Francis Brooklyn Terriers men's basketball seasons
St. Francis
Saint Francis
Saint Francis